Strike Back: Vengeance, as it is known in the United Kingdom, is a ten-part British-American action television serial and is the third installment of Strike Back. The main cast for the series includes Philip Winchester, Sullivan Stapleton, Rhona Mitra, Michelle Lukes, Rhashan Stone, Liam Garrigan, Charles Dance and Vincent Regan. In the series, Section 20 are on the hunt for four nuclear triggers, which are in the hands of billionaire and philanthropist Conrad Knox (Dance), across continental Africa. In the meantime, Michael Stonebridge (Winchester) wants to avenge his wife's murder, and Damian Scott (Stapleton) contends with a past acquaintance. 

Vengeance was commissioned by Sky1 and Cinemax (the second year since Cinemax was brought on board to co-produce the show) in October 2011. The series began filming in January 2012 and took place across South Africa. It premiered in the United States on 17 August 2012, and later in the United Kingdom on 2 September. Viewership averaged 310,000 for Cinemax and 770,000 for Sky1. Critical reactions of Strike Back: Vengeance were generally positive. Vengeance was released on DVD in Region 2 on 5 November 2012 and in Region 1 on 6 August 2013.

Episodes

Cast and characters

Philip Winchester returns as Sergeant Michael Stonebridge. At the conclusion of the second series, his wife became pregnant, and he was contemplating leaving the service to raise his child, the third series would follow the aftermath of his decision. Winchester states that in the beginning of the series, something happens to Stonebridge, and as a result the character becomes darker, which carries throughout the series. Sullivan Stapleton also returns as Stonebridge's partner, former Delta Force operator Damian Scott. Stapleton was originally contracted to appear in the show for two years after joining Strike Back. Rhashan Stone also returns as Major Oliver Sinclair, and Michelle Lukes as Sergeant Julia Richmond. Richmond becomes more involved in the field in Vengeance. Liam Garrigan plays Section 20 officer Sergeant Liam Baxter.

In January 2012 it was announced that Rhona Mitra was cast as Captain (promoted to Major) Rachel Dalton, replacing Colonel Eleanor Grant (Amanda Mealing) as head of Section 20 following her death at the conclusion of Project Dawn. Mitra described the character's role as the leader of Section 20 as "she's not mum, she's not auntie, she's like sister, and it's like a sister coming to tell the brothers what to do," as well as being like "a lioness who's been dropped in amongst silverbacks." Mitra found the experience to be "intellectually, physically and creatively" stimulating.

Charles Dance plays Conrad Knox, the series' primary antagonist. Knox is using his organisation, to clean the streets of Africa by taking away its weapons, as a front to arm his own militia. Vincent Regan plays mercenary Karl Matlock, Knox's "task man," and Natalie Becker plays sniper and Matlock's partner Jessica Kohl. The South African television and radio personality had to learn how to put together, fire, and reload six different firearms. Stephanie Vogt recurs as Christy Bryant, a Central Intelligence Agency (CIA) operative who holds "big dark" secrets over Scott. Shane Taylor recurs as Craig Hanson, a character who worked with Stonebridge before the latter joined Section 20.

Production

Development
Strike Back began with a six-part first series developed by BSkyB, and broadcast two episodes a week from 5 to 19 May 2010 on Sky1. It was based on a book of the same name from former Special Air Service (SAS) soldier turned novelist Chris Ryan. A second series with a longer run of ten episodes, Strike Back: Project Dawn, was commissioned by Sky in August 2010, and in February 2011, it was announced that Sky entered a co-production deal with the American television network Cinemax. On 6 October 2011, Cinemax announced they renewed the show for a ten-part third series (or second season in the United States). Sky1 announced the renewal one day later.

Tony Saint returned to write a number of episodes as well as co-executive produce the series, while Bill Eagles and Paul Wilmshurst returned to direct; Eagles directed four episodes, while Wilmshurst directed two. Julian Holmes directed episodes five and six, and film director Michael J. Bassett also directed two episodes of the series. Andy Harries and Huw Kennair-Jones executive produced the series. The series also included consultants who work in counterterrorism, who provided insight into the environment.

Training
Like the preceding series, the cast were trained by former special forces officers. Stapleton was allowed to perform some stunt driving. Lukes meanwhile, spent three and a half weeks training as her character would be more involved out in the field. Some cast members felt they went in with more responsibility for Vengeance; Realising that some of the fans and military officers pointed out some procedural errors in Project Dawn, the cast were more accurately trained to correct them.

Filming

Filming began in South Africa in January 2012. The first block of two episodes were originally set to be shot primarily in the neighbouring country of Mozambique. However one week beforehand, there was a "freedom fighter rally" that took place in the country, and the production staff had to rethink their strategy as they felt that it would be unsafe to film action sequences while civilians were using live weapons. However, two days were spent filming some interior scenes in Mozambique, but the cast were not allowed to carry firearms. The rest of the block resumed filming in Cape Town, and the rest of the series was largely shot in the city, Western Cape, and Johannesburg. Production made use of local civilians to play crowds. In one such instance locals portrayed a group of rioters in the township of Langa in Cape Town.

The cast were able to perform most of their own stunts, although they carried risks. In one particular instance during a shoot on a rooftop, Stapleton and Winchester were singed during a grenade prop stunt. Although both took cover, a whirlwind carried the blast to the actors.

Release

Broadcast and ratings
In the United States, a promotional trailer was first released on Cinemax's sister network HBO before the fifth season premiere of the popular supernatural drama True Blood. The show premiered on 17 August 2012, showing the first two episodes back-to-back, and continued weekly until the finale on 12 October. The series advertised two songs from the 2012 Bob Dylan album Tempest; "Early Roman Kings" were included in a teaser clip of the show, and "Scarlet Town" was featured in the premiere. Vengeance premiered to 390,000 American viewers, with encores increasing the viewership to over half a million. Ratings for the series premiere was down by approximately half compared with the premiere episode of Project Dawn, which was seen by almost 1.1 million viewers. Vengeance averaged 310,000 viewers, and an 18 to 49 rating of 0.13, on Cinemax.

In the United Kingdom, the series was premiered on Sky1 on 2 September 2012 at 9pm, and continued weekly until 4 November. According to preliminary numbers 385,000 viewed the series premiere, equalling a 1.6 per cent audience share in its timeslot, and became the third most watched non-sports broadcast on pay-TV, behind The Simpsons and Sinbad, which also aired on Sky1. Ratings were down compared with the premiere of Project Dawn, which was seen by 616,000 according to preliminary figures. Final numbers for the Vengeance premiere raised the initial figure to 770,000, though it was still down from the 1.137 million that had seen the Project Dawn premiere.

Home video release
Vengeance was released on DVD, published by 2entertain, in the United Kingdom on 5 November 2012. It was released with a "15" British Board of Film Classification (BBFC) certificate (indicating it is unsuitable for viewers under the age of 15 years). It will later be released on DVD and Blu-ray Disc in the United States on 6 August 2013, with special features including audio commentaries.

Critical reactions
The American review site Metacritic rated the series a 75 out of 100, indicating "generally favorable reviews" from six critical reviews.

References

External links
 Strike Back at Sky1
 Strike Back at Cinemax
 

2012 American television seasons
2012 British television seasons
V